Mervyn Garfield Thompson (14 June 1935 – 10 July 1992) was a  New Zealand coal miner, academic, playwright and theatre director. He was one of the founders of Court Theatre in Christchurch, an artistic director of Downstage Theatre in Wellington and writer in residence at the University of Canterbury. His theatrical writing championed the downtrodden and featured a revival and refinement of the genre of songspiel. He is regarded as one of New Zealand's most significant and controversial playwrights.

Life
Thompson was born in the small mining town of Kaitangata in South Otago. His family moved to the West Coast where he variously lived in mining towns such as Reefton and Runanga. he left school at the age of 15 and spent 5 years working as a coal miner. During this period he first became involved in amateur dramatics.

He attended Canterbury University in his twenties, studying English, and came under the influence of Ngaio Marsh. He played the role of Proculeius in her 1959 production of Antony and Cleopatra, from which he earned the nickname 'Proc' which stuck for the rest of his life. Graduating with an MA in 1964, he became a university lecturer in 1965. Thompson died of throat cancer in 1992. He had one son, who is autistic.

Theatre
In 1970, Thompson and Yvette Bromley proposed the founding of a professional theatre in Christchurch, following the earlier establishment of Downstage in Wellington and Mercury Theatre in Auckland.

Controversy
In February 1984, Thompson, then a lecturer at Auckland University, was abducted, threatened to have his penis cut off, and left tied to a tree in an Auckland park wearing a sign labelling him a rapist. The abduction was allegedly staged by a feminist action group based at the university following an accusation by one of his ex students. Thompson vigorously denied the accusation, admitting he had an affair with the  ex student but claiming it was consensual. The abduction imitates the plot of a stage play Setting the Table by Renée, a friend of Thompson. Thompson had acted as dramaturg at the workshopping of the play. The incident made headlines for some time and had a major impact on Thompson's career, with protests at many performances of his solo show Coaltown Blues. The controversy inspired the novel The Shag Incident by Stephanie Johnson, published in 2002.

Plays
With date of premiere production

O! Temperance
1972

First Return
1974

Songs to Uncle Scrim
A songplay about the Great Depression. Uncle Scrim refers to broadcaster Colin Scrimgeour. First produced at Downstage Theatre, Wellington, 11 March 1976. The play was revived and extensively reworked for a Christchurch production in 1989.

A Night at the Races
1977

Songs to the Judges
1980 A songplay about racial issues in New Zealand with music by William Dart. Two of the songs, "Gather Up the Earth" and "On That Day" are based on the sayings of Te Whiti o Rongomai.

The New Zealand Truth Show
Covers 50 years of New Zealand history as seen through the filter of the tabloid newspaper "Truth". New Independent Theatre, Auckland, 1982

Coaltown Blues
Probably Thompson's best-known work, a solo show which played 114 performances in main centres and small towns. – 1984

Children of the Poor
Adapted from the 1934 novel by John A. Lee.

Jean and Richard
Initially a radio play which won a Mobil Radio Award, it was adapted for the stage and premiered at Court Theatre in 1990. The play is a fantasy in which Jean Batten and Richard Pearse meet in the afterlife.

Lovebirds
1990 A semi-autobiographical drama on the theme of sexual addiction. Wagner's 'Tristan and Isolde" is interwoven with the story of the tempestuous affair between a sculptor and his lover.

Passing Through
Directed by Stuart Devenie. Premiere 1991, Court II, Christchurch.
A solo performance which was a personal journey through the history of New Zealand theatre, including excerpts from his own work and that of Bruce Mason and others. Passing Through played for three separate seasons in Christchurch and toured to Wellington, Dunedin and Auckland. A planned small town tour was cancelled due to Thompson's declining health.

Bibliography
 Selected Plays – Pilgrims South Press, Dunedin, 1984  (First Return, O! Temperance, Songs to Uncle Scrim, Songs to the Judges)
 All My Lives (autobiography)
 Coaltown Blues (playscript) – Hazard Press, Christchurch
 Children of the Poor (playscript) – Hazard Press, Christchurch, 1990 
 Singing the Blues (autobiography) – Blacktown Press, Christchurch, 1991 
 Passing Through and Other Plays – Hazard Press, Christchurch 1992

References

External links
 Te Ara streaming audio of Thompson singing the title song from Coaltown Blues
 Playmarket NZ bio

1935 births
1992 deaths
New Zealand male dramatists and playwrights
New Zealand theatre directors
Academic staff of the University of Auckland
University of Canterbury alumni
People from Otago
People from the West Coast, New Zealand
Deaths from esophageal cancer
20th-century New Zealand dramatists and playwrights